is a Japanese manga series by Shō Harusono, serialized online via pixiv Comic website since 2016. It has been collected in nine tankōbon volumes by Media Factory. A two-volume novel adaptation by Kotoko Hachijō was published by Media Factory from October 2018 to March 2020. A spin-off manga by Harusono titled  has been serialized in Media Factory's shōjo manga magazine Monthly Comic Gene since March 2019 and has been collected in two tankōbon volumes. Sasaki and Miyano follows the story of two male high school students as their friendship gradually becomes romantic.

An anime television series adaptation by Studio Deen aired from January to March 2022. An anime film premiered in Japan in February 2023.

Characters

A short, bishōnen first-year student. Despite being attracted to girls, he is a self-identified fudanshi-- a male fan of yaoi manga-- and is watchful for tropes of the genre when they appear in his real life. He hides his hobby from most people out of embarrassment, though he happily shares it with Sasaki. In middle school he often felt self-conscious about his androgynous appearance, an insecurity he gradually grows out of after reaching high school.

A tall second-year boy who befriends Miyano at the start of the story. Though he is generally friendly and open to others, his appearance and demeanor have earned him a reputation as a delinquent. He is more expressive than Miyano in his emotions and is the first to recognize his attraction towards him. He eventually becomes Miyano's boyfriend.

A classmate of Sasaki and mutual friend of both him and Miyano. Being a year older than Miyano, he shows a strong protective instinct towards him.

 (Japanese); Brendan Blaber  (English)

Media

Manga
The series is written and illustrated by Shō Harusono. It has been serialized online via pixiv Comic website since 2016. It has been collected in nine tankōbon volumes by Media Factory. The manga is licensed in North America by Yen Press. The spin-off manga Hirano and Kagiura is also licensed in North America by Yen Press.

Volume list

Spin-off manga

Novels

Hirano and Kagiura

Sasaki and Miyano

Anime
An anime adaptation was announced on November 20, 2020. The adaptation, later revealed to be a television series, is animated by Studio Deen and directed by Shinji Ishihira, with Yoshiko Nakamura handling series' composition, Maki Fujii designing the characters, and Kana Shibue composing the music. The series aired from January 10 to  March 28, 2022, on Tokyo MX and other networks. The opening theme song is "Mabataki" (Blink) by Miracle Chimpanzee, while the ending theme song is "Ichigo Sunset" (Strawberry Sunset) by Yusuke Shirai and Soma Saito as their respective characters. Funimation licensed the series outside of Asia, which was later moved to Crunchyroll following Sony's acquisition of the company. Medialink licensed the series in Southeast Asia and South Asia; and is available for fans to catch on the Ani-One Asia YouTube channel, iQiyi, bilibili, etc. An anime OVA episode was released with the ninth volume of the manga on July 27, 2022.

The series was released on DVD and Blu-ray in Japan across 4 volumes, each volume containing 3 episodes. In North America, Crunchyroll released the complete season on Blu-ray on January 3, 2023.

After the final episode, it was announced that the series would be receiving a new anime project. It was later revealed to be an anime film, titled Sasaki and Miyano: Sotsugyō-hen, with the main cast and staff returning from the anime series. It premiered in Japan on February 17, 2023, along with an anime short adaptation of the Hirano and Kagiura spin-off manga.

Episode list

Notes

References

External links
Anime official website 

2018 Japanese novels
2020 Japanese novels
2022 anime television series debuts
2023 anime films
Anime films based on manga
Anime series based on manga
Crunchyroll anime
Japanese webcomics
Kadokawa Dwango franchises
LGBT in anime and manga
Media Factory manga
Medialink
Romance anime and manga
School life in anime and manga
Shōjo manga
Slice of life anime and manga
Studio Deen
Tokyo MX original programming
Webcomics in print
Yaoi anime and manga
Yen Press titles